Candles at Nine is a 1944 British mystery film directed by John Harlow and starring Jessie Matthews, John Stuart and Beatrix Lehmann.
A wealthy man taunts his relations and staff about which of them shall inherit his estate after he changes his Will; the same night, he falls down the stairs. His money is left to a distant female relative; a target for intrigue, from some, and murder, from another. It is based on the 1943 novel The Mouse Who Wouldn't Play Ball by Anthony Gilbert.

Plot
After the mysterious death of wealthy old Everard Hope (Eliot Makeham), his avaricious relatives are little pleased to discover that his estate has been left to distant relation Dorothea Capper (Jessie Matthews), a young showgirl. The one condition of the will is that she must stay in Hope's spooky mansion for a month. After several attempts on Dorothea's life, detective William Gardener (John Stuart) decides to investigate.

Cast
 Eliot Makeham as Everard Hope  
 Beatrix Lehmann as Julia Carberry, Everard's Housekeeper  
 John Salew as Griggs, Everard's Butler  
 Joss Ambler as Garth Hope  
 Vera Bogetti as Lucille Hope, Garth's Wife  
 Andre Van Gyseghem as Cecil Tempest  
 Winifred Shotter as Brenda Tempest, Cecil's Wife  
 Reginald Purdell as Charles Lacey  
 Hugh Dempster as Hugh Lacey  
 Jessie Matthews as Dorothea Capper the Heiress  
 John Stuart as William Gardener, Turf Commission  
 Ernest Butcher as Everard's Gardener  
 C. Denier Warren as Middleton the Executor  
 Patricia Hayes as Gewndolyn the Maid

Critical reception
TV Guide dismissed the film as a "Tedious mystery"; while Allmovie wrote, "the creaky pacing by director John Harlow makes the first half of the movie seem more soporific than atmospheric...the movie finally takes off when Matthews shows up on screen, and the visuals, the editing, the music, and the pacing all come to life. The problem there is that she looks a little long-of-tooth for the role she's playing, in terms of the element of wide-eyed wonder that she must display at her sudden good fortune -- at 37, even with lots of energy and great makeup, she looks awkward doing a role that would have been better suited to her in 1934. Beatrix Lehmann's portrayal of the housekeeper whose services she inherits comes from the Judith Anderson school of performing...and her creepy portrayal is one of the best things in the movie. There are also a couple of charming (and brief) musical sequences, one of them breaking the tension at just the right moment as the thriller's plot winds tighter. The whole thing doesn't hang together seamlessly, but it's an enjoyable diversion, if one hangs in past the first 18 minutes' tedium."

References

External links
 

1944 films
1944 mystery films
British black-and-white films
British mystery films
Films directed by John Harlow
Films set in London
Films shot at British National Studios
1940s English-language films
1940s British films